The 1937 Marshall Thundering Herd football team represented Marshall College (now Marshall University) as a member of the Buckeye Athletic Association (BAA) during the 1937 college football season. Marshall outscored its opposition 297–19, posting a 9–0–1 record and winning the BAA title with a mark of 4–0–1 in conference play. The team's only blemish came in a tie against Ohio. Marshall played their home games for the 11th consecutive season at Fairfield Stadium, their home venue until the conclusion of the 1990 season, when it was demolished and replaced by Joan C. Edwards Stadium.

Schedule

References

Marshall
Marshall Thundering Herd football seasons
College football undefeated seasons
Marshall football